Sangat may refer to:

 Sangat (Sikhism), the Punjabi form of the Sanskrit term sangti, means company, fellowship and association
 Sangat (TV series), a 2015 Pakistani romantic drama serial
 Sangat, India, a city in Bathinda district in the Indian state of Punjab
 Sangat Island, a tiny island in the Philippines
 Sangat TV, a British television station for the Sikh community
 Sangat, a caste in the Newar caste system